Hungary competed at the 2018 European Athletics Championships in Berlin, Germany, from 6–12 August 2018. A delegation of 35 athletes were sent to represent the country.

The following athletes were selected to compete by the Hungarian Athletics Association.

Medals

Results
 Men 
 Track and road

Field events

Women
 Track and road

Field events

Combined events – Heptathlon

See also
Hungary at the 2018 European Championships

References

Nations at the 2018 European Athletics Championships
Hungary at the European Athletics Championships
European Athletics Championships